The 59 class is an old class of steam locomotive built by Baldwin-Lima-Hamilton Corporation for the New South Wales Government Railways of Australia.

History
The class were ordered from Baldwin-Lima-Hamilton (the former Baldwin Locomotive Works) to relieve motive power shortages. The design is a variation on the USATC S200 Class Mikado engine, a design which first appeared in 1941.

Twenty locomotives entered service between August 1952 and March 1953. The most immediately apparent difference is the rather stubby short tender that was specially built to allow the 59 class to be turned on a standard  turntable. It was the specification of these tenders which considerably delayed the delivery from the initial order. Unfortunately due to the weight of the locomotive it was eventually discovered, in service, that most  turntables could not turn the 59 class engine due to balancing issues.

The class was the first 'new build' (as opposed to conversions) of oil-fired engines to be introduced by the New South Wales Government Railways and were the first locomotives to be built for NSW by Baldwin since 1905. They were initially used on the Short North from Enfield to Broadmeadow. They were soon placed in service on both the Main Western and Main South lines and, although their light axle load made them available to a large proportion of the state, their sphere of operation was limited by the location of oil fueling facilities. Accordingly, they saw most of their service, as oil burners, working on the Main North and North Coast lines, as well as in the Sydney metropolitan area.

In 1961, it was decided to convert the majority of the class to coal burning. Seventeen were converted using an ashpan based on the 38 class engine arrangement, together with modifications to the smokebox, fitting of brick arches, grates, firehole doors, etc. In August 1974, 5916 was sent to the Eveleigh Carriage Workshops for the same use. In 1977, both were transferred to the former NSW Rail Transport Museum at Thirlmere

During 1968/69, 59 class were often used on freight trains to  during a motive power shortage.

Preservation
Withdrawals began in June 1969 with the last withdrawn in December 1972. Five engines of the class are preserved.

References

External links

2-8-2 locomotives
Baldwin locomotives
Freight locomotives
Railway locomotives introduced in 1952
59
Standard gauge locomotives of Australia